Shubham Shyamsunder Sharma (born 24 December 1993) is an Indian first-class cricketer who plays for Madhya Pradesh. He is right handed middle order batsman who can even contribute with his Right arm off break bowling . He made his First-class cricket debut against Baroda in November 2013. He has scored 3 tons in first class career. Apart from his batting, he is a disciplined fielder and a fruitful bowler, who always tries to capitalize his innings. His best all-round performance was against Bengal in November 2018 where he bagged a five-wicket haul and a century as well.

He made his Twenty20 debut on 4 November 2021, for Madhya Pradesh in the 2021–22 Syed Mushtaq Ali Trophy.

References

External links
 

1993 births
Living people
Indian cricketers
Madhya Pradesh cricketers
Cricketers from Indore